William Austin Horn (1841–1922) was an Australian mining magnate, pastoralist, politician, author, sculptor and philanthropist. Somewhat eccentric, in 1892 he was the donor of a copy of Antonio Canova's Venus, Adelaide's then controversial first public statue, which is still on display on North Terrace, Adelaide. Horn also built Wairoa, Aldgate, known for its magnificent gardens and captured in a watercolour by William Tibbits.

Family
Horn was born 26 February 1841 at Menaroo (an old name for the Monaro district), New South Wales, to Edward Kirk Horn, a storekeeper, and his wife Emily, née Austin. The family moved to South Australia in 1852, where Horn was educated at the Collegiate School of St Peter.

On 24 September 1879 in St Andrews Church, Walkerville, he married Penelope Elizabeth Belt; they had two daughters and six sons.

In 1896 he sold Wairoa and relinquished all of his official positions in Adelaide. From 1898 he lived at Wimbledon Park House in England. He returned briefly to Adelaide in 1901, and in 1907 to sell his Walkerville house, Holmwood. He held that "an Australian is simply an Englishman born in the sun". He died on 23 December 1922 in London.

Mining interests

Copper deposits had earlier been discovered in the Yorke Peninsula region at Wallaroo, and a further discovery was made nearby in 1861 on the property of pastoralist Walter Watson Hughes. On learning that news of the discovery had been leaked to another party, Hughes dispatched the young William Horn on a 22-hour horse ride to successfully register the claim in Adelaide. This claim became the prosperous Wheal Hughes, at Moonta.

Politician
Horn was the member for Flinders in the South Australian House of Assembly from 1887 until 1893.

Philanthropy

In 1890 he gave the National Gallery of South Australia the famous Heinrich Heuzenroeder collection of coins, comprising 11,000 specimens, some of which were Roman.

He equipped and sponsored the Horn Scientific Expedition of 1894, the first primarily scientific expedition to study the natural history of Central Australia.

He donated three statues to Adelaide: 'Venus by Canova' on North Terrace; the Farnese 'Hercules' in Pennington Garden west; and 'The Athlete' in Angas Gardens.

Statue: Venere Di Canova
Venus by Canova was donated by Horn in 1892. Somewhat controversial at the time of its unveiling in 1892, this piece was the first of Adelaide's street statues. It is a copy in Carrara marble of the statue of Venus by Antonio Canova – the original is at the Pitti Palace in Florence. (Photo of the original.) – Pedestal of Sicilian and Kapunda marble. Executed by Fraser & Draysey. Presented by Mr W A Horn. Unveiled 3 September 1892, by His Worship the Mayor (F.W. Bullock, Esq.).

Author
Horn published two books: Bush Echoes (1901), a book of verse of the stockwhip-and-saddle-school; and Notes by a Nomad (1906).

References

1841 births
1922 deaths
Members of the South Australian House of Assembly
Australian writers
Australian philanthropists
20th-century Australian sculptors
19th-century sculptors